Betty Swenson (November 4, 1933 – December 20, 2016) was an American politician who served in the Colorado House of Representatives from the 12th district from 1985 to 1993.

She died of pancreatic cancer on December 20, 2016, in Longmont, Colorado at age 83.

References

1933 births
2016 deaths
Republican Party members of the Colorado House of Representatives